José Van Baelen (20 February 1927 – 30 January 2015) was a Belgian fencer. He competed in the individual and team sabre events at the 1960 Summer Olympics.

References

1927 births
2015 deaths
Belgian male fencers
Belgian sabre fencers
Olympic fencers of Belgium
Fencers at the 1960 Summer Olympics